Amaranthus mitchellii is commonly known as Mitchell's amaranth or boggabri weed. It is from the family Amaranthaceae. It is a generally useful plant and is said to be "edible".

Care and habitats
These plants require sandy and moist soil and full sunlight.

Location
The plant is found mainly in Australia, in Queensland and Victoria.

Characteristics
As an annual, it grows up to 0.5 m in height. It is pollinated by wind and is self-fertile.

Uses
Amaranthus mitchellii is edible, and can be used as dye. Germination is very quick.

References

mitchellii
Flora of Australia
Plants described in 1870